Paul Dailey Jr. (1915-1990) was a former member of the Wisconsin State Assembly.

Biography
Dailey was born on January 20, 1915, in Elcho, Wisconsin. He attended the University of Wisconsin–River Falls and the University of Minnesota. He died on March 3, 1990.

Career
Dailey was elected to the Assembly in 1962. Additionally, he was a member of the school board and President of Elcho. He was a Republican.

References

People from Langlade County, Wisconsin
Republican Party members of the Wisconsin State Assembly
School board members in Wisconsin
University of Wisconsin–River Falls alumni
University of Minnesota alumni
1915 births
1990 deaths
20th-century American politicians